The following is a timeline of the history of the city of Saint Petersburg, Russia.

17th–18th centuries

 1611 – Nyenschantz built by Swedes.
 1703
 City founded by Tsar Peter the Great
 Cabin of Peter the Great built.
 Artillery museum formed.
 1709 – Petrischule founded.
 1710 – Saint Sampson's Church built.
 1711 – Menshikov Palace opens.
 1712
 City becomes capital of Russian Empire.
 Winter Palace built.
 1714
 Library of the Russian Academy of Sciences founded.
 Summer Palace of Peter the Great built.
 1716 – Catholic Church of St. Catherine founded.
 1718 – Saint Petersburg Police established.
 1719 – Summer Garden laid out.
 1720
 Hermitage Bridge opens.
 New Holland Island created.
 1721 – Ligovsky Canal constructed.
 1724
 Saint Petersburg Academy of Sciences founded.
 Saint Petersburg Mint founded.
 1725
 Peterhof Palace built (approximate date).
 Death of Peter the Great.
 1727 – Kunstkamera built.
 1728 – State capital moves to Moscow from St. Petersburg.
 1731 – Cadet Corps founded.
 1733 – Peter and Paul Cathedral built.
 1736 – Fire.
 1738 – Imperial Ballet School established.
 1740
 Peter and Paul Fortress built.
 Mariinsky Ballet founded (approximate date).
 1744
 Lomonosov Porcelain Factory founded.
 Twelve Collegia built.
 1748 – Smolensky Lutheran Cemetery opens.
 1754
 Stroganov Palace built.
 Anichkov Palace built.
 Transfiguration Cathedral built.
 1756 – Alexandrinsky Theatre founded.
 1757
 Academy of the Three Noblest Arts founded.
 Vorontsov Palace built.
 1759 – Page Corps founded.
 1762 – Winter Palace built.
 1764
 Hermitage Museum established.
 Institute for Noble Maidens founded.
 1770
 Foundling Hospital established.
 Moika Palace built.
 1771 – Chicherin House built.
 1773
 Mining School established.
 Volkovo Cemetery established.
 1774 – Roller coaster pavilion built at Oranienbaum.
 1777
 The Karl Knipper Theatre is founded. 
 The Neva caused flooding.
 1779 – Free Russian Theatre opens.
 1780
 Saint Andrew's Cathedral consecrated.
 Chesme Church built.
 1782 – Bronze Horseman monument unveiled.
 1783
 Russian Imperial Opera Orchestra formed.
 Kamenny Theatre opens.
 1785
 City Duma established.
 Hermitage Theatre opens.
 Great Gostiny Dvor built.
 Marble Palace built.

19th century

 1801
 Friendly Society of Aficionados of Elegance formed.
 Saint Michael's Castle built.
 Tsarina's Meadow renamed Field of Mars.
 1802 – Saint Petersburg Philharmonia formed.
 1804 – Petersburg Pedagogical Institute established.
 1805 – Russian Naval Museum established.
 1806 – Police Bridge rebuilt.
 1807 – Constantine Palace built.
 1808 – Smolny Institute building constructed.
 1810
 Military Engineering school established.
 Stock Exchange built.
 1811 – Kazan Cathedral built.
 1812 – Syn otechestva begins publication.
 1813 – Red Bridge built.
 1814
 Imperial Public Library opens.
 Narva Triumphal Arch erected.
 1818
 Otechestvennye Zapiski begins publication.
 Blue Bridge built.
 Asiatic Museum founded.
 1819 – Saint Petersburg University formed.
 1822 – Yelagin Palace built.
 1823 – Admiralty building rebuilt.
 1824 - The Neva caused flooding.
 1825
 December – Interregnum.
 Decembrist revolt.
 Northern Bee begins publication.
 Mikhailovsky Palace built.
 1826 – Kamenny Island Theatre building constructed.
 1829 – General Staff Building constructed.
 1832 – Zoological Museum established.
 1833
 Obvodny Canal opens.
 Mikhaylovsky Theatre founded.
 1834 – Alexander Column unveiled.
 1835
 Imperial School of Jurisprudence founded.
 Trinity Cathedral built.
 1836
 Sovremennik begins publication.
 Premiere of Glinka's opera A Life for the Tsar.
 1838 – Moscow Triumphal Gate erected.
 1839
 Observatory opens.
 Bolshoi Zal built.
 1842 – Alexander Park established.
 1844 – Mariinsky Palace built.
 1848 – Beloselsky-Belozersky Palace expanded.
 1850 – Blagoveshchensky Bridge built.
 1851
 Moscow – Saint Petersburg Railway begins operating.
 Nicholaevsky rail terminal opens.
 1858 – Saint Isaac's Cathedral built.
 1860 – Mariinsky Theatre opens.
 1861 – Nicholas Palace built.
 1862
 Saint Petersburg Conservatory founded.
 New Michael Palace built.
 November: Premiere of Verdi's opera La forza del destino.
 1863 – Pavel Military School established.
 1866
 Vestnik Evropy begins publication.
 Dostoyevsky's fictional Crime and Punishment published.
 1867 – Khlebnikov founded.
 1869 - Population: 667,926.
 1870 – Riihimäki – Saint Petersburg Railway constructed.
 1874 – Premiere of Musorgsky's opera Boris Godunov.
 1876 – School of Technical Drawing founded.
 1877 – Ciniselli Circus opens.
 1878 – Bestuzhev Courses and Stieglitz Museum established.
 1879
 Peter the Great Museum of Anthropology and Ethnography established.
 Nobel Brothers Petroleum Company headquartered in city.
 1881 - Population: 861,303.
 1882 – Imperial Music Choir formed.
 1888 - Ship canal completed.  
 1890
 Saint Petersburg Prison for Solitary Confinement built.
 Population: 954,400.
 1893 - Premiere of Tchaikovsky's Symphony No. 6.
 1894 – Ves Peterburg directory begins publication.
 1895 – Conversion of Mikhailovsky Palace into Russian Museum.
 1897 - Population: 1,267,023.
 1900
 Russian cruiser Aurora launched.
 Suvorov Museum founded.

20th century

1900s–1940s
 1905
 January – Bloody Sunday.
 October – Saint Petersburg Soviet formed.
 Population: 1,429,000.
 1907 – Electric trams begin operating.
 1909 – Na Liteinom Theatre founded.
 1910 – March: Soyuz Molodyozhi art exhibit held.
 1913 – Population: 2,318,645.
 1914 – City renamed "Petrograd."
 1916
 Grigori Rasputin assassinated.
 Palace Bridge built.
 1917
 February Revolution begins.
 March – Petrograd Soviet formed.
 July Days.
 August – Golos Truda begins publication.
 October Revolution.
 1918
 State capital moves to Moscow from Petrograd.
 Osobaya Drammaticheskaya Truppa organized.
 Ioffe Institute established.
 1920 – Theatrical re-enactment of Storming of the Winter Palace.
 1921 – Art Culture Museum opens.
 1922 – Leningrad Young People's Theatre opens.
 1923 – Russian Museum of Ethnography opens.
 1924 – City renamed Leningrad.
 1928 – Circus museum opens.
 1929 – Young Theatre founded.
 1931 – Komarov Botanical Institute and Leningrad Radio Orchestra established.
 1932
 Shosseynaya Airport begins operating.
 Leningrad Union of Soviet Artists and St Petersburg Union of Composers founded.
 Bolshoy Dom built.
 Avrora Cinema active.
 1934
 Sergey Kirov assassinated.
 Leningrad Secondary Art School established.
 Premiere of Shostakovich's opera Lady Macbeth of the Mtsensk District.
 1936
 Arctic and Antarctic Museum opens.
 Memorial Lenin Komsomol Theatre established.
 1938 – Museum of History and Development of Leningrad established.
 1941
 Siege of Leningrad begins.
 Road of Life begins operating.
 1942 – Russian Museum of Military Medicine founded.
 1944
 Siege of Leningrad ends.
 State Puppet Theatre of Fairy Tales established.
 1946 – Moskovsky Victory Park opens.
 1949 – Leningrad Affair.

1950s–1990s

 1953
 Pavlovsky District becomes part of city.
 Pushkin Museum established.
 1954 – Levashovo, Pargolovo, and Pesochny become part of city.
 1955 – Saint Petersburg Metro begins operating.
 1962 – Saint Petersburg TV Tower constructed.
 1963 – Aeroflot Tupolev Tu-124 Neva river ditching.
 1965 – Population: 3,329,000 city; 3,641,000 urban agglomeration.
 1967 – Museum of Electrical Transport established.
 1971
 Dostoevsky Museum opens.
 Rimsky-Korsakov Museum established.
 1974 – Na Fontanke Youth Theatre founded.
 1981 – Leningrad Rock Club opens.
 1984
 Teatralnaya laboratoriya founded.
 Sister city relationship established with Los Angeles, United States.
 1985 – Population: 4,867,000.
 1987
 Na Neve Theatre opens.
 Zazerkalie (theatre) opens.
 1988 – Xenia of Saint Petersburg canonized.
 1989
 Komedianty Theatre founded.
 Akhmatova Museum opens.
 1990 – Ostrov Theatre opens.
 1991
 City renamed Saint Petersburg.
 Flag design adopted.
 Anatoly Aleksandrovich Sobchak becomes mayor.
 1993 – Tunnel nightclub opens.
 1994
 Legislative Assembly of Saint Petersburg formed.
 St Petersburg Ballet Theatre founded.
 1996 – Vladimir Anatolyevich Yakovlev becomes city governor.
 1997 – Toy Museum established.
 1998
 Politician Galina Starovoytova assassinated.
 Nabokov Museum opens.
 2000 – City designated administrative center of Northwestern Federal District.

21st century

 2003
 Aleksandr Dmitriyevich Beglov becomes city governor, succeeded by Valentina Ivanovna Matvienko.
 Peter & Paul Jazz Festival begins.
 Museum of Optical Technologies opens.
 2004
 Big Obukhovsky Bridge opens.
 Sergey Kuryokhin Center for Modern Art established.
 2005 – Gas incident.
 2006 – 32nd G8 summit held.
 2007 – Dissenters' March.
 2008 – Side by Side (film festival) begins.
 2009 – Gallery of Contemporary Sculpture and Plastic Arts opens.
 2010
 Yota Space art festival begins.
 Erarta art museum established.
 2011
 Georgy Sergeyevich Poltavchenko becomes city governor.
 Saint Petersburg Dam inaugurated.
 Saint Petersburg Ring Road opens.
 St. Petersburg International Legal Forum begins.
 2013 – September: 2013 G-20 Saint Petersburg summit.

See also
 History of Saint Petersburg
 Governor of Saint Petersburg
 Floods in Saint Petersburg
 List of theatres in Saint Petersburg
 Timelines of other cities in the Northwestern Federal District of Russia: Kaliningrad, Pskov

Disambiguation pages
 Convention of St Petersburg (disambiguation)
 Saint Petersburg Declaration (disambiguation)
 Treaty of Saint Petersburg (disambiguation)

References

Bibliography

Published in 18th–19th centuries

Published in 20th century
 
 
 
 
 
 
 
 
 
 
 
 
 
Duncan Fallowell, One Hot Summer in St Petersburg (London, Jonathan Cape, 1994)

Published in 21st century
 Julie A. Buckler. Mapping St. Petersburg: Imperial Text and Cityshape. 2005
 George E. Munro. The Most Intentional City: St. Petersburg in the Reign of Catherine the Great. Madison: Farleigh Dickinson University Press, 2008
 
 Paul Keenan. St Petersburg and the Russian Court, 1703–1761. 2013
 Charles Emerson,  1913: In Search of the World Before the Great War (2013) compares it to 20 major world cities on the eve of World War I; pp 110–132.
 Catriona Kelly. St Petersburg: Shadows of the Past. 2014
 Steven Maddox. Saving Stalin's Imperial City: Historic Preservation in Leningrad. 2014

External links

Saint Petersburg-related lists
Years in Russia
Saint Petersburg